Maktab Nasional (National College in English) is a private Catholic mission secondary school located in Likas, Kota Kinabalu, Sabah under the jurisdiction of the Archdiocese of Kota Kinabalu. 

It was founded as a Catholic mission school in 1985 under the auspices of the Archdiocese of Kota Kinabalu as well as the Sacred Heart Cathedral parish and is a member school of the St Simon Educational Complex as well as the family of schools under the Sacred Heart Cathedral parish (together with its kindergarten and primary sections of Taska & Tadika Datuk Simon Fung as well as SRS Datuk Simon Fung) along with SK Sacred Heart, Karamunsing, SM St. Francis Convent, Bukit Padang, Tadika St. Francis, Karamunsing, Tadika Shan Tao, Karamunsing, SM La Salle, Tanjung Aru and SJK (C) Shan Tao, Kepayan Ridge.

It is noted as the only privately-owned Roman Catholic mission school in the state.

History 
The school was founded in 1985 and was located at the present St Peter's College Initiation Year campus in Karamunsing, Kota Kinabalu. 

Then, a group of new buildings were built in Jalan Istiadat, Likas in 1988 to form the daughter primary school which was later to be knowns SRS Datuk Simon Fung in honour of the late Bishop Datuk Simon Fung of the-then diocese (now Archdiocese) of Kota Kinabalu. 

With the tragic loss of the old primary school block in 1993 at the Jalan Istiadat premises, the schools moved to the present location at Kingfisher Park, Likas, where it took another two years until 1995 to form the Kompleks Pendidikan St. Simon (St. Simon Educational Complex) together with the kindergarten and pre-school section known as Taska & Tadika Datuk Simon Fung that has been established since 1990.

Internal structure 
The school offers the Malaysian public examinations, PT3 and SPM and also the IGCSE international examinations for selected students. As it is a Catholic secondary school under the auspices of the Sacred Heart Cathedral parish, along with other fellow Catholic mission schools under the parish's care (including the school's kindergarten and primary daughter schools) such as SK Sacred Heart, Karamunsing, SM St. Francis Convent, Bukit Padang, Tadika St. Francis, Karamunsing, Tadika Shan Tao, Karamunsing, SM La Salle, Tanjung Aru and SJK (C) Shan Tao, Kepayan Ridge, the school's supervisor is the rector of the Sacred Heart Cathedral, Kota Kinabalu, concurrently held by Rev. Fr. Paul Lo from Kudat, whilst the current chaplain is the Rev. Fr. Wilfred Atin, a native of Ranau, who is also the incumbent rector of St. Michael's Church, Penampang (by which he is also concurrently the school's ex-officio board of governors' member representing the clergy quota) and its current principal is Mdm. Marie Yong Pik Hua, who took over from the only alumnus to serve in the similar post, Dr. Alexander Funk Yun Leong in 2019 after his tenure contract ended for the past six years since 2013.

Co-curricular activities

Musical Theater 
The school staged the first ever musical theater in Sabah with the production of “The King and I” in 1985, The school has  also produced stage performances that included “The Variety Show Concert” (1987), “The Wizard of Oz” (1992), “What A Friend Is” (1998), “My Fair Lady” (2002), “Beauty and the Beast” (2005) “Summer Camp High” (2010) and Crazy Dreams (2013) and "Meant To Be, A 2016 Musical" (2016).

Notable alumni 

 Roger Wang, award-winning Malaysian composer and acoustic guitarist.

References

External links 
 Official Website

Educational institutions established in 1985
1985 establishments in Malaysia
Private schools in Malaysia
Secondary schools in Malaysia
Cambridge schools in Malaysia
Catholic schools in Malaysia